Newt fencing is a barrier designed to control the movement of great crested newts, other amphibians or reptiles.  It can also be called drift fencing or temporary amphibian fencing (TAF).  It consists of a low fence of plastic sheeting, buried a short way into the ground and supported by lightweight posts usually made of wood or plastic.  It is used to keep animals out of working areas, to keep them inside safe areas of their habitat, to intercept migration routes, or to control their movement to help their capture for translocation.  It may be used in conjunction with pitfall traps placed at the foot of the fence.  It is most commonly used in connection with building projects, to minimise harm to protected species.

Background

Legislation
The great crested newt (Triturus cristatus) is an amphibian native to the United Kingdom but also widespread across Northern Europe. Whilst it is relatively widespread in the UK (in fact the UK hosts one of the great crested newt's most significant populations), it is rare on a European wide basis. The great crested newt is listed as a "strictly protected fauna species" under appendix II of the Convention on the Conservation of European Wildlife and Natural Habitats:
and consequently is protected under UK legislation through the Wildlife and Countryside Act and the Conservation (Natural Habitat) regulations 1994. Under these regulations it is an offence to intentionally disturb, injure or kill any great crested newt, or disturb or destroy its habitat. Likewise, the Habitats Regulations 2010 do not apply to all newts, and in the case of e.g. smooth newt species, they are protected differently, under the Wildlife and Countryside Act 1981 (as amended).

Habitat
The great crested newt's natural habitat requirements are standing fresh water for breeding purposes, but the majority of its time is spent on dry land. They favour semi-natural habitats such as rough grassland, hedgerows and scrub woodland. An individual newt tends to have a range centred upon its breeding pool. The breeding stage of the life cycle takes place in spring, from February through to April. Unfortunately this life cycle and the use of both terrestrial and aquatic habitats may put the newts into conflict with humans. Brownfield sites often contain very good terrestrial habitat for great crested newts, and land within  from newt breeding ponds includes a significant proportion of the UK.

Planning
As part of the planning process for any development, an environmental impact assessment should include an ecological survey, which should in turn identify the potential for loss of habitat and the impact on the local population of great crested newts. If the assessment identifies possible loss of habitat or the potential to kill or disturb individual newts, it will be necessary for the developer to apply to the Department for Environment, Food and Rural Affairs for a licence.  The licence application should set out what measures will be taken to ensure that the local population is not threatened, and how potential loss of habitat can be mitigated.

Fencing and trapping

To ensure that individual newts are not injured or killed by development activities, it may be necessary to enclose the site in a newt proof fence, trap the individuals within the site and/or remove them to a suitable release site.  As the great crested newt is a European strictly protected fauna species, erection of newt fencing or any capture of the animals requires a licence.

Construction
The newt fence usually consists of a plastic membrane partially buried in the ground (usually to about ) The above ground portion being supported by timber stakes placed at regular intervals along the line of the fence. The fence normally has a below ground horizontal return facing out of the site to minimise the risk of newts re-entering the site through the disturbed soil layer. It usually has some form of overhang along the top edge to reduce the possibility of newts climbing over the fence.

Newt fencing types
Fences tend to fall into three basic categories, temporary (less than two years lifespan), semi-permanent (two to five years lifespan) and permanent (greater than two years lifespan).  The materials used to construct them tend to vary with the length of time the fence is to remain operable. A temporary fence is normally constructed from UV-stabilised polythene sheet or woven geotextile. Semi-permanent fences are usually constructed from 1mm thick plastic panels. Permanent fences are usually constructed from rigid plastic or galvanised steel panels. In the case of temporary fencing materials, the underground return is created by folding the material at a ° angle along the base of the trench, and the top overhang by rolling the top edge of the membrane over a number of times to create a roll. For permanent fencing, the underground return is sometimes omitted and instead the fence is buried deeper (usually ). The top overhang is created by making a fold in the material at the manufacturing stage.

Newt collection and trapping
Trapping is undertaken through the use of buried buckets (pitfall traps) placed alongside the fence material. The idea being that the newts follow the fence along until they fall into the open bucket. Carpet tiles (terrestrial refuges) may be used in conjunction with pitfall traps. Again these are placed alongside the fence and provide ideal shelter for newts whilst they are resting (daytime and during dry or cold periods).

Once an ecologist is satisfied that all of the newts have been trapped from the site and that the terms of the licence have been met, construction work can begin.

References

Further reading
  Chris Blandford Associates (CBA), Wildlife Fencing Design Guide. CIRIA, 2006. 
  Gent, A.H., & Gibson, S.D., Herpetofauna Workers' Manual. Peterborough, Joint Nature Conservation Committee, 1998 (revised edition 2003).

External links
English Nature Great Crested Newt Mitigation Guidelines.
English Nature 'Great crested newts on your farm' Advice Leaflet.
Frequently Asked Questions about amphibian/newt fencing.
Natural England Wildlife Management & Licensing Service

Newts
Amphibians of Europe
Conservation in the United Kingdom